Mikołaj Lebedyński (born 14 October 1990) is a Polish professional footballer who plays as a forward for Stal Mielec.

Career

Club
After going through the youth departments of hometown clubs Arkonia and Pogoń, Lebedyński was picked for the first team of the latter in 2007. In his first season as a regular, he played 1014 minutes in which he scored 7 goals.

In August 2011, Lebedyński joined Roda JC Kerkrade on a one-year loan in the Dutch Eredivisie. He made a permanent transfer in the summer of 2012 and played 24 matches in which he scored only 3 times. As he could not impress, he was released in July 2013.

References

External links
 
 

1990 births
Living people
Sportspeople from Szczecin
Association football forwards
Polish footballers
Poland youth international footballers
Poland under-21 international footballers
Polish expatriate footballers
Pogoń Szczecin players
Roda JC Kerkrade players
BK Häcken players
Podbeskidzie Bielsko-Biała players
Wisła Płock players
GKS Katowice players
Górnik Łęczna players
Chrobry Głogów players
Stal Mielec players
Ekstraklasa players
I liga players
Allsvenskan players
Eredivisie players
Expatriate footballers in the Netherlands
Polish expatriate sportspeople in the Netherlands
Expatriate footballers in Sweden
Polish expatriate sportspeople in Sweden